Criorhina tricolor is a species of hoverfly in the family Syrphidae.

Distribution
Canada, United States.

References

Eristalinae
Diptera of North America
Hoverflies of North America
Insects described in 1900
Taxa named by Daniel William Coquillett